The bigthorn skate (Rajella barnardi) is a species of fish in the family Rajidae. It is found in Equatorial Guinea, Gambia, Ghana, Guinea, Guinea-Bissau, Mauritania, Morocco, Namibia, Senegal, Sierra Leone, South Africa, Western Sahara, possibly Angola, possibly Benin, possibly Cameroon, possibly the Republic of the Congo, possibly Ivory Coast, possibly Gabon, possibly Liberia, possibly Nigeria, and possibly Togo. Its natural habitat is open seas.

Description
Fairly large spines at eyes and along centre of back and tail. Colour brown with groups of lighter spots. Recorded size up to 102 cm.

Synonyms
Raja barnardi Norman, 1935
Raja confundens Hulley, 1970
Raja dageti Capapé, 1977

References

Rajella
Taxa named by John Roxborough Norman
Taxonomy articles created by Polbot
Fish described in 1935
simple:Bigthorn Rajella